Alberta Provincial Highway No. 45, commonly referred to as Highway 45, is an east-west highway in central Alberta, Canada that extends from Highway 15 northeast of Edmonton to the Saskatchewan border. It runs generally parallel to Highway 16 (Yellowhead Highway).

Major intersections 
From west to east:

References 

045